Chris Caughman (born October 14, 1967) is an American politician who has served in the Mississippi State Senate from the 35th district since 2016.

References

1967 births
Living people
Republican Party Mississippi state senators
21st-century American politicians